Jeremy Corbyn, the Member of Parliament for Islington North, stood as a candidate in the 2015 British Labour Party leadership election, in a successful campaign that made him the leader of the Labour Party.

His campaign was announced in an article for the Islington Tribune on 3 June 2015.  Corbyn pledged to stand on a "clear anti-austerity platform" and because he wanted to "give Labour Party members a voice" in the debate.

Commentators in the media widely predicted that Corbyn would struggle to pass the threshold of 35 nominations from Labour MPs required to become a candidate. However, he managed narrowly—and at the last minute—to secure sufficient support from parliamentary colleagues, with 36 nominations in total. Around 12 of the MPs who nominated him actually supported other candidates, but "lent" him their support in order to widen the contest. Corbyn was reported to say: "We had two minutes to spare, it was easy."

He was originally seen as a rank-outsider, given odds of 200/1 to win by bookmakers in June 2015. However, following a series of televised and radio debates with the other three candidates, Andy Burnham, Yvette Cooper and Liz Kendall, Corbyn received the highest number of supporting nominations from Constituency Labour Parties, winning over 100 by the end of July. Corbyn went on to gain the support of six of the Labour Party's fourteen affiliated trade unions, including the UK's two largest trade unions, Unite and UNISON,

On 12 September 2015 Corbyn was elected Leader of the Labour Party in a landslide victory, with 59.5% of first-preference votes.

Economic policy 

Corbyn's proposed economic policies, referred to as "Corbynomics" by some in the media, are reported to be "heavy influenced" from a blog created by political economist Richard Murphy. Corbyn's economic platform has been endorsed by a number of prominent economists, including David Blanchflower, a former member of the Bank of England's monetary policy committee, and Steve Keen. They were among 41 academics who signed a letter to The Guardian which argued: "The accusation is widely made that Jeremy Corbyn and his supporters have moved to the extreme left on economic policy. But this is not supported by the candidate's statements or policies. His opposition to austerity is actually mainstream economics, even backed by the conservative International Monetary Fund". The Nobel-Prize-winning economist Joseph Stiglitz said he was unsurprised at support for anti-austerity campaigners like Corbyn following the "disappointment" of policies pursued by New Labour. Robert Skidelsky offered a qualified endorsement of Corbyn's proposals to carry out QE through a National Investment Bank.

Corbyn's economic proposals have received some criticism, namely from the economist John Van Reenen at the London School of Economics, the BBC Economics Editor Robert Peston The Economist, the Financial Times  The Daily Telegraph, the free-market Centre for Policy Studies, Shadow Chancellor Chris Leslie, former Foreign Secretary David Miliband, Shadow Business Secretary Chuka Umunna and the three other leadership candidates.

Investment 
Corbyn proposed to have the Bank of England create money to invest in housing and public transport, described by Corbyn as "people's quantitative easing". This would aim to turn the UK into a high-skill, high-tech economy and to build more council houses in order to lower long-term housing benefit costs. To achieve this, the Bank would purchase bonds for a state-owned "National Investment Bank".

Opponents have claimed it would increase the risk of investing in the UK, meaning that the government would have to pay higher interest rates on its debt. It would also clash with Article 123 of the EU's Lisbon Treaty, which prevents central banks from printing money to finance government spending, and could cause a legal battle with the European Court of Justice.

Nationalisation 
In an interview with The Independent on Sunday on 9 August 2015, Corbyn said: "I think we should talk about what the objectives of the party are, whether that's restoring Clause Four as it was originally written or it's a different one. But we shouldn't shy away from public participation, public investment in industry and public control of the railways." The Independent has cited opinion polls to suggest that many of Corbyn's policies, such as the renationalisation of railways and energy companies, have polled popularly with the general public.

Corbyn claims renationalisation would save money by both joining up a fragmented market, thereby reducing duplication in the privatised rail market (estimated by Ian Taylor as costing up to £1.2 billion in a 2012 report) and keeping what is currently profit for the energy and train operating companies. Both the energy and the train operating companies claim that they make a low return on their money (3.9% for the energy companies and 3.4% for the train companies) and a City analysis cited by The Guardian and Financial Times newspapers, of the nationalisation policies advocated by Corbyn, indicates a figure of at least £124 billion would be needed to purchase controlling shares in the "Big Six" national energy providers plus the National Grid.

Taxation 
In June 2015, Corbyn set out his plan for "tax justice", which included a more progressive tax system, raising the top rate of income tax, finding up to £120 billion which he claims is lost through tax avoidance and evasion, by investing £1 billion in HMRC, and reducing the £93 billion which companies receive in tax relief according to Kevin Farnsworth, a senior lecturer from York University, an amount including railway and energy subsidies, regional development grants, relief on investment and government procurement from the private sector.

Jolyon Maugham QC, who had previously advised Ed Miliband on tax policy, criticised the plans and claimed to have found a £100 billion "black hole".

Domestic policy

Arts 
Corbyn stated in August 2015, that "every child deserves the chance to learn a musical instrument, act on a stage, and develop their creative imagination" and that a Corbyn-led Labour Party would re-invest in cultural programs and arts education. He also condemned the £82 million cuts that the Coalition government had made between 2010 and 2015, arguing in favor of "an alternative programme for the arts". In September 2015, Corbyn announced a policy entitled "Arts for Everyone" detailing his plans to expand the arts and creative industries, including proposals to establish a Cabinet Committee dedicated to the issue, a "National Creative Apprenticeship Service" and guidelines on the minimum standards of artists' pay.

Corbyn unveiled his arts policy document at a rally in Dalston, appearing alongside screenwriter Frank Cottrell Boyce and actress Julie Hesmondhalgh. However, the arts columnist of  The Daily Telegraph, Rupert Christiansen attacked the proposals as not being properly funded.

Education 
In July 2015, Corbyn authored an article for LabourList in which he put the case for creating a "National Education Service", for decent skills, opportunities and "learning from cradle to grave". Comparing the right to education with the right to health, the principle on which the NHS was founded in 1946, Corbyn proposed introducing universal childcare, the abolition of tuition fees and the restoration of maintenance grants and increased funding for adult skills training.

Environment 
Corbyn's environmental policy, set out in his "Protecting Our Planet" manifesto, involves developing a "resource-efficient, green economy", creating one million new green climate jobs, "leading an end to the era of fossil fuels" and transitioning to renewable energy, ending the Conservative government's policy of hydraulic fracking, addressing climate change and air pollution, conserving ecosystems and protecting the welfare of animals. Corbyn's platform has been welcomed by high-profile figures in the Green Party, including former leader Caroline Lucas and Molly Scott Cato and by The Ecologist magazine.

In an interview with the Financial Times, in August 2015, Corbyn pledged to renationalise the Big Six energy companies and to also bring the National Grid into the public sector. In response to the announcement, financial analysts at Jefferies Group LLC published a report estimating that the cost of such policies could reach £185 billion. On the same day that his energy policies were announced, Corbyn also told Greenpeace's Energy Desk website that he would consider re-opening the South Wales coalfield, a suggestion that drew some criticism from some environmentalists and from Yvette Cooper, one of Corbyn's opponents for the leadership, who accused him of making "false promises".

Health 
Corbyn has long campaigned against the "creeping privatisation" of NHS services. For example, he has been critical of the Blair government's use of private finance initiatives as a source of public sector procurement, particularly its involvement in the construction of NHS hospitals. He has suggested that the Treasury should bail out hospitals struggling to pay off debt resulting from PFI deals. Corbyn has also released a policy document on addressing the lack of funding for care and the stigma and discrimination facing those that experience mental health problems.

Immigration 
Corbyn has spoken of the socio-economic and cultural benefits of immigration to the United Kingdom, particularly of multiculturalism and the high number of immigrant workers employed by the National Health Service. He also condemned the Labour Party's 2015 election manifesto pledge to reduce levels of immigration as "appalling". Corbyn has accused David Cameron of using "incendiary language" when he accused a "swarm" of people as the cause of the Calais migrant crisis and also described the Home Office's response to the Syrian refugee crisis as "heartless and powerless", during the Sky News debate in September 2015.

Welfare 
At the Second Reading of the Welfare Reform and Work Bill in July 2015, Corbyn joined 47 other Labour MPs to oppose the bill, describing it as "rotten and indefensible", whilst the other three candidates abstained. In August 2015, he called on Iain Duncan Smith to resign as Secretary of State for Work and Pensions after it emerged that thousands of disabled people had died after being found fit to work by Work Capability Assessments between 2011 and 2014. At the Guardian Live leadership hustings, Corbyn condemned the reforms that had taken place since 2010, pledged that he would defend the welfare state as leader and insisted that politicians should show "a heart" when addressing issues of poverty and homelessness

Unionism 
In August 2015, when asked by Glasgow's Herald newspaper if he would describe himself as a British unionist, Corbyn replied "No, I would describe myself as a socialist. I would prefer the UK to stay together, yes, but I recognise the right of people to take the decision on their own autonomy and independence". He also criticised the decision by Scottish Labour to work with Conservatives in the Better Together campaign, and said that he had not actively participated in the referendum campaign. Corbyn also stated his belief that economic inequality exists across the UK, and that Labour should unite people on the basis of a "radical economic strategy".

On the subject of forming alliances with the SNP after the 2020 general election Corbyn was the only leadership candidate who confirmed he would be open to working with the party, saying to Aaron Bastani of Novara Media that "If there isn't a Labour majority but a minority and we've got to work with other parties – probably on the basis of a day-to-day arrangement or ... a supply arrangement then do that"

Foreign policy

Defence 
Corbyn also stated his opposition to meeting the NATO requirement of 2% of GDP spending on defence, arguing at the Daily Mirror hustings event, in August 2015, that NATO "should have been wound up in 1990" when the Cold War ended. However this position was criticised by Ben Judah in The Independent, and by fellow candidate Andy Burnham, who said he would resign from a Corbyn shadow cabinet over such a policy.

On the 70th Anniversary of the Hiroshima bombing, Corbyn released a policy document detailing his opposition to the renewal of the Trident missile system, citing his support for unilateral nuclear disarmament. Corbyn suggested that the 11,000 jobs supported by Trident could be replaced by "socially productive" jobs in renewable energy, railways and housing.

In September 2015, it was reported that Corbyn had been advised, by members of his campaign team, to put his controversial positions on NATO and the renewal of Trident "on the back-burner" in order to unify the party and prevent high-profile, moderate shadow ministers, such as Burnham and Chuka Umunna, from resigning.

European Union 
In June 2015, following a series of unsuccessful talks between the Syriza-led government of Greece and its creditors to agree the terms of a third bailout deal, Corbyn accused the latter of being "determined to navigate [Greece] against the rocks, for daring to vote for a better future". At a party hustings in Warrington, in July 2015, Corbyn speculated that, should David Cameron be unable to protect workers' rights and environmental protection laws in his negotiations with European leaders, he would be prepared to support a 'No' vote in the proposed referendum on EU membership. His words were met with criticism from the other leadership candidates, notably Liz Kendall, who responded by saying that the party ought to be "unashamedly pro-EU".

In August 2015, Nigel Farage, Leader of the UK Independence Party, wrote in  The Daily Telegraph, inviting Corbyn to join him to campaign in favour of withdrawing from the EU. Corbyn has, however, re-affirmed his pro-Europeanism and support for the UK remaining a member of the European Union.

Middle East
Corbyn is a prominent member of Stop the War Coalition and the Palestine Solidarity Campaign. He holds an 'anti-interventionist' position on foreign affairs, opposing current British action against Islamic State in the Syrian, Libyan and Iraqi conflicts. He has also campaigned for the recognition of the State of Palestine and been a long-standing critic of the Israeli government. At a public meeting organised by The Jewish Chronicle in July 2015, Corbyn called for an arms embargo against Israel. In an interview with The Daily Telegraph in September 2015, the Hamas Deputy Foreign Minister, Ghazi Hamad, praised Corbyn for his "sympathetic" stance on the Israeli–Palestinian conflict. However, Corbyn's views on the conflict have also been criticised by The Jewish Chronicle and Joan Ryan, the Chairman of Labour Friends of Israel.

In August 2015, Corbyn stated that if he became Labour leader, he would issue a public apology, on behalf of the Labour Party, for its role in the 2003 invasion of Iraq by Britain, and for the resulting deaths of 179 British soldiers and thousands of Iraqi civilians. Corbyn also suggested that, should the Chilcot Inquiry find former Prime Minister Tony Blair guilty of war crimes, he should stand trial.

In an appearance on Question Time in July 2015, Corbyn suggested that the growth of the Islamic State of Iraq and the Levant may have been aided by Britain's arms sales to authoritarian Gulf states such as Saudi Arabia, Qatar and Bahrain.

Controversies

Accusations of antisemitism
In August 2015, several publications queried Corbyn's connection with people and organisations accused of antisemitism such as Raed Salah and Paul Eisen of Deir Yassin Remembered. Corbyn rejoined that when he met Salah, he was unaware that he had been convicted of racial incitement, and that he had not made antisemitic comments during their conversation about Israel. He also confirmed that he had attended DYR events and made limited cash donations but has "no contact now whatsoever" with the DYR director, previously exposed as a Holocaust denier. Corbyn described Holocaust denial as "obviously vile" and his office released a statement to say he is "proud to represent a multicultural constituency of people from all over the world and to speak at every opportunity of understanding between Christian, Hindu, Jewish, Muslim and other faiths."

The Jewish Chronicle described Corbyn's response as unsatisfactory but leading  Jewish critics of Israel defended Corbyn a week later in an open letter to the newspaper. Fellow MP Diane Abbott also said that "there will always be people who are less than savoury in liberation movements" and suggested that Corbyn is being smeared by people trying to make him guilty by association: "the British establishment is frozen with fear about the prospect of his victory".

Women-only railway carriages
Corbyn raised the possibility in August 2015 of introducing women-only carriages on public transport, as well as a 24-hour hotline for women to report cases of harassment. He said that although his aim was to "make public transport safer for everyone from the train platform, to the bus stop to the mode of transport itself", he would consult women on whether such carriages would be welcome, after the idea was suggested to him.

His proposal was condemned by all three rival Leadership candidates, Yvette Cooper, Andy Burnham and Liz Kendall, with Cooper stating that Corbyn's plan was "turning the clock back instead of tackling the problem", while Conservative Women's Minister Nicky Morgan said she was "uncomfortable with the idea", which sounded like "segregation".

Opinion polling 

On 21 July 2015, a YouGov poll for The Times, sampling the voting intentions of current Labour Party members, projected Corbyn to win the leadership election, with 43% of first preferences and 53% of the final redistributed total. The surge in popularity was reported to have greatly surprised even Corbyn himself. On 11 August, The Times published the results of its second YouGov poll, indicating that Corbyn was on course for a "decisive victory"; it claimed that support for Corbyn had increased further to 57% and that he would therefore win on first preferences. The Guardian reported a Survation poll showing that, after being shown a short video of all four candidates, more voters from both the wider electorate and previous Labour, Liberal Democrat and UK Independence Party (UKIP) voters indicated a preference for Corbyn.

However, on 15 August, The Independent on Sunday reported a ComRes poll it had commissioned of the general public, revealing that if  Corbyn were to become Labour Leader, voters believed it would reduce Labour's chances of winning the next election, whilst the election of David Miliband, who was defeated by his brother in 2010, would stand the best chance of Labour winning the next election.

Momentum 

Corbyn was announced to have been elected Leader of the Labour Party, at a conference held in central London, with over 59% of first-preference votes. Following this result, a new group called Momentum was formed. Momentum describes itself as a grassroots political advocacy group which grew out of the Jeremy Corbyn for Labour Leader campaign which describes itself as "a network of people and organisations that will continue the energy and enthusiasm of Jeremy's campaign". The idea was denounced by Labour critics of the leader as part of an attempt to mobilise factionally, leading to the deselection of moderate MPs and councillors "who are not judged politically correct by the veteran Bennite organisers behind Momentum".  Momentum had about 60,000 supporters, charges no membership fee, organises mostly through social media and has around 50 local groups across the UK.

Labour MP and former shadow minister Emma Reynolds describes Momentum as "a parallel organisation to the Labour Party" (something which the organisation denies) and likened them to the Militant tendency. Some hard left groups have attempted to affiliate themselves with the organisation, thus causing concern among the soft left of the Labour Party. Others on the far left have criticised the group strongly.

Endorsements

See also
 Jeremy Corbyn
 2015 Labour Party leadership election (UK)
 2015 Andy Burnham Labour Party leadership campaign
 2016 Jeremy Corbyn Labour Party leadership campaign

References

External links 
 Campaign website
 Jeremy Corbyn Campaign 2015 (Supporters) Ltd, Companies House
 Labour Party website

Election campaigns in the United Kingdom
Jeremy Corbyn
2015 in British politics
2015 Labour Party (UK) leadership election
Jeremy Corbyn Labour Party leadership campaign